Mary Hales was a Democratic member of the Wyoming House of Representatives, representing the 36th district from 2007 until 2010.

She was an unpledged superdelegate in the 2016 Democratic Presidential primary, and announced her support for Hillary Clinton.

Family
Hales has 4 children.

Education
Hales obtained her degree in Political Science from Park University and her Secondary Teaching Certificate from the University of Wyoming.

Professional experience
Hales was an Associate Broker for Stratton Real Estate.

Political experience
Hales was a candidate for the Wyoming House of Representatives, District 36 in 2010.

External links
Wyoming State Legislature - Representative Mary Hales
Project Vote Smart - Representative Mary Hales (WY) profile

References

Democratic Party members of the Wyoming House of Representatives
Living people
Park University alumni
Women state legislators in Wyoming
21st-century American politicians
21st-century American women politicians
Year of birth missing (living people)